Mozhga (Možga) is a town in the Udmurt Republic, Russia, located at the confluence of the Syuga and Syugailka Rivers,  southwest of Izhevsk, the capital of the republic. Population:

History
It was founded in 1835 as a settlement around Syuginsky glass works. The works was built by the merchant Fyodor Chernov from Yelabuga and became known for the production of technical glass, jugs, and animal figurines. In 1916, Syuginskaya railway station was built near the factory settlement. After the October Revolution of 1917, it was renamed Sovetsky, and later Krasny. It was granted town status and given its present name in 1926.

Administrative and municipal status
Within the framework of administrative divisions, Mozhga serves as the administrative center of Mozhginsky District, even though it is not a part of it. As an administrative division, it is incorporated separately as the town of republic significance of Mozhga—an administrative unit with the status equal to that of the districts. As a municipal division, the town of republic significance of Mozhga is incorporated as Mozhga Urban Okrug.

Climate
Mozhga is within temperate continental climate, characterized by large annual range of temperatures; with hot summers and cold winters. Significant changes in temperature are normally observed during the day.

Economy
Mozhga is an important industrial center of southwestern Udmurtia.

Demographics
The ethnic makeup of the town is:
Russians: 56.5%
Udmurts: 25.8%
Tatars: 15.6%

References

Notes

Sources

External links
Official website of Mozhga 
Unofficial website of Mozhga 

Cities and towns in Udmurtia
Populated places established in 1835